WKJA is a Christian radio station licensed to Brunswick, Ohio, broadcasting on 91.9 MHz FM. WKJA is owned by Christian Healthcare Ministries, Inc.

References

External links
WKJA's website

	

KJA
KJA